Brant (Dixon Farm) Airport  is located  south southwest of Brant, Alberta, Canada.

References

External links
Page about this airport on COPA's Places to Fly airport directory

Registered aerodromes in Alberta
Vulcan County